The 1966–67 season was the 28th season in UE Lleida's existence, and their 1st year in Segunda División after 1966 promotion.

Squad

Competitions

Pre-season

Copa Presidente

League

Results by Round

Copa del Generalísimo

Copa Presidente 1967

External links
1966-67 season

1967
Lleida